Edgar Urquizo Olivares (born January 25, 1989) is a Mexican football manager and former player.

References

1989 births
Living people
Association football midfielders
Bravos de Nuevo Laredo footballers
Ascenso MX players
Liga Premier de México players
Mexican football managers
Footballers from Coahuila
Mexican footballers